Yinggui Lake is an artificial lake in the Tianfu Art Park, surrounded by two art museums in the Jinniu District, northwest of central Chengdu, Sichuan, China.

Overview
Yinggui Lake is the main lake in the Tianfu Art Park and covers more than 200 acres. There are three lakes in total, Fangfei Lake, Hehua Lake, and Yinggui Lake. The park itself covers an area of 3,033 acres, with scenic views.

The official launch of the Tianfu Art Park was held on 6 November 2021, with the opening of two new museum buildings by the lake, as a main focus of the 2021 Chengdu Biennale, and operated by the Chengdu Art Academy. The two museum buildings are the Chengdu Museum of Contemporary Art and Chengdu Tianfu Art Museum, forming a new part of the Chengdu Art Museum.

See also
 Chengdu Museum of Contemporary Art
 Chengdu Tianfu Art Museum
 Tianfu Art Park

References

2021 establishments in China
Geography of Chengdu
Lakes of Sichuan
Artificial lakes of China
Arts in Chengdu